The Journal of International Management is a quarterly peer-reviewed academic journal covering research on  international business and management. It was established in 1995 and the editor-in-chief is Masaaki Kotabe (Temple University). The journal is published by Elsevier and according to the Journal Citation Reports, the journal has a 2018 5-year impact factor of 3.54.

References

External links 
 
 

Business and management journals
Elsevier academic journals
Quarterly journals
Publications established in 1995
English-language journals